Albert Victor "Eutrope" Eutropius (10 January 1888 – 26 May 1915) was a rugby union player, the second black man to play for . He was killed in World War I.

Born in Cayenne, French Guiana, on 10 January 1888, Eutropius moved to Paris in 1910. There, he played for Sporting Club Universitaire de France in the finals of the French championships in 1911 and 1913. He was picked for France in the match against Ireland on 24 March 1913.

Rugby career

International appearances

Military career
Eutropius was in Africa as a colonial administrator at the start of the First World War. He was commissioned second lieutenant and sent to Cameroon, where he died at Cayenne on 26 May 1915 from a shot to the head.

His grave is at N'Gato and he is commemorated on the monument to the dead of Cayenne.

References

Bibliography

1888 births
1915 deaths
French rugby union players
French military personnel killed in World War I
Rugby union forwards